Julien Vauclair (born October 2, 1979) is a Swiss former professional ice hockey defenseman who spent most of his career with HC Lugano in the National League (NL). He made his professional debut in 1996 with HC Ajoie in Switzerland's second tier, Swiss League (SL). He spent three seasons within the Ottawa Senators organization of the National Hockey League (NHL). The Senators selected him 74th overall in the 1998 NHL Entry Draft.

Playing career
As a youth, Vauclair played in the 1992 and 1993 Quebec International Pee-Wee Hockey Tournaments with a team from Switzerland.

Vauclair was drafted 74th overall by the Ottawa Senators of the National Hockey League (NHL) in the 1998 NHL Entry Draft and played one NHL game for the Senators in the 2003–04 NHL season. Vauclair has also played in the American Hockey League with the Grand Rapids Griffins and the Binghamton Senators. Vauclair began his professional career with Lugano in 1998, and he returned to them in 2004 and has played for them since.

On June 2, 2019, Vauclair agreed to a one-year contract extension with HC Lugano, stating that this would be his final season of professional hockey.

On March 26, 2020, Vauclair officially announced his retirement from professional hockey. Vauclair played all of his 791 regular season games (273 points) in the National League with HC Lugano, as well as 154 playoffs games (34 points). He won 2 NL titles with the team and was named twice to the NL Media Swiss All-Star Team. In addition to that, his jersey with the number 3 was to be retired by HC Lugano during in the 2020–21 season, however with the interruption of the COVID-19 pandemic, his jersey was later retired in a game against HC Ajoie on 16 September 2022.

International play
Vauclair has played internationally for Switzerland in three Olympics and nine World Championships, winning a silver medal in the 2013 World Championships. On January 6, 2014, Vauclair was named to Team Switzerland's official 2014 Winter Olympics roster.

Career statistics

Regular season and playoffs

International

Awards
 2004 AHL All-Star Game
 2013 World Championships All-Star Team

See also
List of players who played only one game in the NHL

References

External links

1979 births
Living people
HC Ajoie players
Binghamton Senators players
Grand Rapids Griffins players
Ice hockey players at the 2002 Winter Olympics
Ice hockey players at the 2006 Winter Olympics
HC Lugano players
Olympic ice hockey players of Switzerland
Ottawa Senators draft picks
Ottawa Senators players
People from Delémont
Swiss-French people
Swiss ice hockey defencemen
Ice hockey players at the 2014 Winter Olympics
Sportspeople from the canton of Jura